Dr. Alok Kumar Suman is an Indian politician. He was elected to the Lok Sabha, the lower house of the Parliament of India from Gopalganj in the 2019 Indian general election as member of the Janata Dal (United). He is also the National Treasurer of JD(U).

Early life and education 
Suman was born to Jai Shri Ram and Patia Devi in a poor family at Jadopur Dukhaharan, Gopalganj district, Bihar. He worked as child labourer on farms to meet daily needs and to continue his primary education.

After completing high school, went to Patna Science College for his Indian School Certificate and then did his Bachelor of Medicine Bachelor of Surgery (MBBS) and Master of Surgery (MS) from Patna Medical College and Hospital.

Career 
After his education, he worked as a resident doctor in Rammanohar Lohia Hospital, Delhi and retired as Deputy Director in Govt. of Bihar. He wrote a scientific thesis on "Abdominal Hernia in Children".

References

https://www.nayaindia.com/details/hindi-news-today/brick-kilns-workers-dr-alok-kumar-suman-gopal-ganj-mp

India MPs 2019–present
Lok Sabha members from Bihar
Living people
Janata Dal (United) politicians
Year of birth missing (living people)
People from Gopalganj district, India